Harvey Douglas Wylie (April 6, 1933 – September 17, 2019) was a defensive back who played nine seasons in the Canadian Football League for the Calgary Stampeders (ending his career with them in 1964). For five consecutive seasons, he was an All-Western All-Star and twice he was an All-Canadian All-Star after playing football at Montana State university.

Wylie was also a punt returner, returning 257 punts for a 6.1 yard per punt average, and especially a prolific kick returner, returning 151 kickoffs for a 28.4 yard per kick average, scoring touchdowns of 105, 110, 104, and 102 yards from 1959 to 1962 

He excelled in several sports: he played Junior "A" Hockey in Calgary and had a tryout with the Chicago White Sox. Wylie was the winner of the CFL's Most Outstanding Canadian Award in 1962. He was inducted into the Canadian Football Hall of Fame in 1980 and the Alberta Sports Hall of Fame and Museum in 1980.

Wylie later went into business and served as President of Beaufort-Delta Oil Project Limited. He died after a heart attack on September 17, 2019.

References

1933 births
2019 deaths
Calgary Stampeders players
Canadian football defensive backs
Canadian Football Hall of Fame inductees
Canadian Football League Most Outstanding Canadian Award winners
Canadian football return specialists
Montana State Bobcats football players
Canadian football people from Calgary
Players of Canadian football from Alberta